Rennia Davis (born February 24, 1999) is an American professional basketball player who plays for the Indiana Fever in the Women's National Basketball Association. She was drafted 9th in the 2021 WNBA Draft.

Early life
Davis was born in Jacksonville, Florida, where she attended Ribault High School. She was a McDonald's All-American and was ranked as the No. 12 overall recruit going into college.

College
Davis played college basketball at the University of Tennessee, where she averaged 15.4 points and eight rebounds over four years. She started 116 of the 118 games she played. She finished her career top 10 in scoring, rebounds, double-doubles, points per game, rebounds per game, free-throw percentage, field goals attempted, and field goals made.

At the University of Tennessee, Davis was named the Tennessee Sports Writers Association Women's College Basketball Player of the Year for the 2020–21 school year. She was an honorable mention All American on the AP, World Exposure Report, USBWA, and WBCA lists that same year. The AP, USBWA, and WBCA gave her the same Honorable Mention in 2019–20. She was also named to the Coaches All-SEC First Team in 2019-2020 and 2020–21 and was named the SEC player of the week multiple times both years.

College statistics

Source

Professional career

Minnesota Lynx
Davis announced she was entering the WNBA Draft in early April 2021.

Davis was selected 9th Overall in the First Round of the 2021 WNBA Draft by the Minnesota Lynx.
She became the 43rd Tennessee women's basketball player to be drafted into the WNBA, the 14th taken in the top 10, and the highest since Diamond DeShields in 2018.

Davis was injured in May 2021 when a stress fracture in her foot put her out indefinitely.

Davis was waived from the Lynx training camp in 2022, but later returned on a hardship contract. She appeared in 1 game and scored her first career WNBA points against the Indiana Fever. On May 12, 2022, Davis was released from her hardship contract.

Indiana Fever
On July 15, 2022, Davis signed with the Indiana Fever

WNBA career stats

Regular season

|-
| align="left" | 2022
| align="left" | Minnesota
| 1 || 0 || 3.0 || 1.000 || .000 || .000 || 0.0 || 0.0 || 0.0 || 0.0 || 0.0 || 2.0
|-
| align="left" | 2022
| align="left" | Indiana
| 7 || 0 || 5.7 || .333 || .000 || .000 || 1.1 || 0.1 || 0.3 || 0.0 || 0.4 || 1.1
|-
| align="left" | Career
| align="left" | 1 year, 2 teams
| 8 || 0 || 5.4 || .385 || .000 || .000 || 1.0 || 0.1 || 0.3 || 0.0 || 0.5 || 1.3

References

Living people
1999 births
American women's basketball players
Basketball players from Jacksonville, Florida
Minnesota Lynx draft picks
Minnesota Lynx players
Tennessee Lady Volunteers basketball players